Carbon nanotube transistor could refer to :
 Carbon nanotube field-effect transistor
 tunnel diode made from a carbon nanotube